Penspen is a provider of engineering and management services to the oil and gas industry based in London, United Kingdom.  Its chief executive officer is Peter O'Sullivan.

The company has conducted the front-end engineering design for the Greece–Italy and Nabucco pipelines, feasibility studies for the Trans-Saharan gas pipeline and Azerbaijan–Georgia–Romania Interconnector, developed integrity policies and procedures for Pemex.

In 2007–2012, Penspen in cooperation with Manchester Jetline and Newcastle University researched the feasibility of using trained dogs to detect leaks in pipelines.

References

Engineering companies of the United Kingdom
Energy engineering and contractor companies